Bhattiprolu railway station (station code:BQU), is a D-category Indian Railways station in Guntur railway division of South Central Railway zone. It is situated on the Tenali–Repalle branch line and provides rail connectivity to Bhattiprolu.

History 
The Tenali–Repalle branch line, constructed by Madras and Southern Mahratta Railway, was opened in 1916.

Structure and amenities 
The station has roof top solar panels installed by the Indian railways, along with various railway stations and service buildings in the country, as a part of sourcing 500 MW solar energy.

See also 
 List of railway stations in India

References 

Railway stations in Guntur district
Railway stations in Guntur railway division
Railway stations on Tenali-Repalle line